Tomas "Tommy" Abuel (born September 16, 1942) is an actor and lawyer from the Philippines.

He appeared in movies T-Bird At Ako (1982) with Nora Aunor and Vilma Santos, Bituing Walang Ningning (1985) with Sharon Cuneta and Cherie Gil.

He is also an award-winning stage actor. He received the Aliw Award for Best Stage Actor for three consecutive years. His memorable theater roles in stage plays like Antigone, Mga Ibong Mandaragit, Anak Ng Araw, Andres Bonifacio, El Filibusterismo, and Florante At Laura, among others. He performed musical plays like Carousel, The King And I, and West Side Story, among others.

Filmography
FilmMana (TV film; 1973)Now and Forever (1973)Paru-parong Itim (1973)Dalawang Mukha ng Tagumpay (1973)Diligin Mo ng Hamog ang Uhaw Na Lupa (1975)Manila in the Claws of Light (1975) - PolThe Rites of May (1976) - JunMga Basag Na Kristal (1977)Karma (1981) - AlfredoT-Bird at Ako (1982) - JakeGaano Kadalas ang Minsan? (1982)To Love Again (1983)Hangurin Mo Ako sa Putik (1983)Kung Mahawi Man ang Ulap (1984) May Lamok sa Loob ng Kulambo (1984) Working Girls (1984) Bukas Luluhod ang Mga Tala (1984) God Save Me! (1985)Lalakwe (1985)Bituing Walang Ningning (1985) - Larry CalmaBakit Manipis ang Ulap (1985)Always in My Heart (1986)Walang Karugtong ang Nakaraan (1987)Boy Negro (1988)
 Kahit Wala Ka Na (1989)Sa Kuko ng Agila (1989)Imortal (1989)Alyas Pogi: Birador ng Nueva Ecija (1990) - ErningMoro (1991)Your Dream Is Mine (1992)Lumuhod Ka sa Lupa (1993)Humanda Ka Mayor!: Bahala Na ang Diyos (1993) Inay (1993) - Defense attorney Relax Ka Lang, Sagot Kita (1994)Forever (1994) - GustingBatas Ko ang Katapat Mo (1995)Sana Maulit Muli (1995) - BenTirad Pass: The Story of Gen. Gregorio Del Pilar (1996) - Eusebio "Maestro Sebio" RoqueMulanay: Sa Pusod ng Paraiso (1996)Ipaglaban Mo II: The Movie (1997)Oo Na, Mahal Na Kung Mahal (1999) - Col. RuizEsperanza: The Movie (1999)Senswal: Bakit Masarap ang Bawal (2000)Di Kita Ma-Reach (2001)Bakat (2002)Chavit (2003) - Jose SingsonDon't Give Up on Us (2006)Lovebirds (2008)Fausta (2009)Last Viewing (2009)Ang Babae sa Sementeryo (2010)Of All the Things (2012) - Umboy's fatherABCs of Death 2 ("I Is for Invincible" segment; 2014) - QuinitoDagsin'' (2016) - Justino

Television

Awards and nominations

References

External links

Tommy Abuel blogspot

Living people
1942 births
Male actors from Manila
Filipino male film actors
Filipino male television actors
ABS-CBN personalities
GMA Network personalities